Andreas Wagner (born 16 April 1972) is a German politician. Born in Bad Tölz, Bavaria, he represents The Left. Andreas Wagner has served as a member of the Bundestag from the state of Bavaria since 2017.

Life 
Wagner completed secondary school and training as a toolmaker, later as a curative nurse. He became member of the bundestag after the 2017 German federal election. He is a member of the Committee on Transport and Digital Infrastructure. In March 2021, he announced not to be reelect in 2021 German federal election.

References

External links 

 Bundestag biography 

1972 births
Living people
Members of the Bundestag for Bavaria
Members of the Bundestag 2017–2021
Members of the Bundestag for The Left
People from Bad Tölz